Silver Link was the first London and North Eastern Railway (LNER) A4 Class locomotive, built in 1935 to pull a new train called the Silver Jubilee.

History

Silver Link entered service with a demonstration journey from King's Cross on 27 September 1935. The record provoked the LNER and their chief rival the London, Midland and Scottish Railway (LMS) into a highly competitive speed war, each attempting to outdo the other by building ever faster locomotives. The main protagonists were Sir Nigel Gresley, LNER's chief mechanical engineer, and his counterpart at LMS, Sir William Stanier.

Naming 
Silver Link was so named after a reference to love in Sir Walter Scott's poem The Lay of the Last Minstrel, which reads:

True love's the gift which God has given
To man alone beneath the heaven;
It is not fantasy's hot fire,
Whose wishes, soon as granted, fly;
It liveth not in fierce desire,
With dead desire it doth not die;
It is the secret sympathy,
The silver link, the silken tie,
Which heart to heart, and mind to mind,
In body and in soul can bind.

The engine was "officially named" (using its real name) in the opening scene of the 1937 comedy film Oh, Mr Porter!.

Scrapping and legacy 
Allocated to Kings Cross shed, it was withdrawn from service on 29 December 1962 when the East Coast Main Line express services were taken over by Deltic diesel locomotives. It was not preserved after withdrawal and was broken up for scrap at Doncaster Works on 7 September 1963, on the same site where it had been built nearly twenty eight years earlier. There was an attempt by Sir Billy Butlin to save the locomotive, but it was unsuccessful.

Two examples of the Silver Link nameplate are on display at the National Railway Museum, York, UK.

The Silverlink area of North Tyneside is named after the locomotive; the name of the area was taken after another A4 locomotive, Bittern, had been displayed at the North Tyneside Steam Railway disguised as Silver Link in the early 1990s.

References

2509
Silver Link
Railway locomotives introduced in 1935
Scrapped locomotives
Standard gauge steam locomotives of Great Britain